Alejandro 'Álex' Pérez Aracil (born 21 January 1985) is a Spanish former footballer who played as a midfielder.

Club career
Pérez was born in Madrid. An unsuccessful youth graduate at local Real Madrid, his input with the first team consisted of one minute against Terrassa FC in the round of 16 of the Copa del Rey, on 8 January 2003. Subsequently, he signed with Gimnàstic de Tarragona on loan, but featured in no second division matches for the Catalans in his sole campaign.

In January 2007, Pérez was released by Real, going on to serve an unassuming stint abroad with Greece's Aris Thessaloniki FC. In that summer he returned home, joining Albacete Balompié of the second tier.

After two seasons with only relative playing time in his second – 15 games, one goal– Pérez was released. He played with lowly Ontinyent CF for four months, then retired in June 2011 at only 26.

Personal life
Pérez's older brother, Miguel, was also a footballer. Both played in Gimnàstic in 2005–06.

Their father, Miguel Ángel, was also involved in the sport. Born in Argentina, he settled in Spain after retiring, having played in the country for Real Madrid and Real Zaragoza amongst other clubs.

References

External links

1985 births
Living people
Spanish people of Argentine descent
Footballers from Madrid
Spanish footballers
Association football midfielders
Segunda División players
Segunda División B players
Real Madrid C footballers
Real Madrid Castilla footballers
Real Madrid CF players
Gimnàstic de Tarragona footballers
Albacete Balompié players
Ontinyent CF players
Super League Greece players
Aris Thessaloniki F.C. players
Spain youth international footballers
Spanish expatriate footballers
Expatriate footballers in Greece
Spanish expatriate sportspeople in Greece